The Novo Selo Training Area is a major Bulgarian military training facility established in 1962, presently used by other NATO nations as well.  The range has a surface area of 144 km2 (55.6 sq. mi), and is situated 45 km (28 mi) from Bezmer Air Base, and 70 km (43.5 mi) from the port of Burgas in Sliven Province, Bulgaria.

The facility has its designated areas and sectors for tank shooting, and nuclear, biological, and chemical defense and reconnaissance training.  The Novo Selo Training Area is highly appreciated by NATO experts and troops, and has become the favored site of annual joint US and Bulgarian troops exercises since 2004.

The Novo Selo Training Area is among the joint US-Bulgarian military bases established according to the 2006 Defense Cooperation Agreement between the United States and Bulgaria.  The US Army started in late 2008 a 61.15 m USD investment in the development of new housing and other infrastructure for the American troops training at Novo Selo Training Area.

See also 
Bulgarian-American Joint Military Facilities

References 
 W. Alejandro Sanchez, Bulgaria, U.S. Bases and Black Sea Geopolitics, Power and Interest News Report, 29 August 2007.
 L. Ivanov and P. Pantev eds., The Joint Bulgarian-American Military Facilities: Public opinion and strategic, political, economic, and environmental aspects, NI Plus Publishing House, Sofia, 2006 (in Bulgarian)
 L. Ivanov ed., Bulgaria: Bezmer and adjacent regions — Guide for American military, Multiprint Ltd., Sofia, 2007, 

Military installations of Bulgaria
Military installations of the United States in Bulgaria